
This is a list of bridges documented by the Historic American Engineering Record in the US state of Nevada.

Bridges

References

List
List
Nevada
Bridges, HAER
Bridges, HAER